Katako-Kombe is a territory of Sankuru Province of the Democratic Republic of the Congo and is part of the region known as Kasaï. It is traditionally considered the homeland of the Tetela people. It is also the birthplace of the Congo’s first prime minister, Patrice Lumumba.

Territories of Sankuru Province